Severino Jefferson (born 29 October 1985) is a Brazilian professional footballer who last played in Canada for the Montreal Impact.

Career
He has previously played in Brazil for Guarani, São Paulo and Nova Venécia, in Italy for Parma, in Switzerland for SC YF Juventus, and in Cyprus for APEP Pitsilia and Ayia Napa.

External links
Player profile at the Montreal Impact

1985 births
Living people
Ayia Napa FC players
APEP FC players
Brazilian expatriate footballers
Brazilian expatriate sportspeople in Canada
Brazilian expatriate sportspeople in Cyprus
Brazilian expatriate sportspeople in Italy
Brazilian expatriate sportspeople in Switzerland
Brazilian footballers
Expatriate footballers in Cyprus
Expatriate footballers in Italy
Expatriate footballers in Switzerland
Expatriate soccer players in Canada
Association football forwards
Guarani FC players
Parma Calcio 1913 players
São Paulo FC players
Montreal Impact (1992–2011) players
Sportspeople from Campinas
SC Young Fellows Juventus players
USL First Division players
Cypriot First Division players